This is a list of events held and scheduled by Kunlun Fight (KLF), a kickboxing and mixed martial arts promotion based in China. The first Kunlun Fight event, Kunlun Fight 1, took place in Pattaya, Thailand on January 25, 2014. Each Kunlun Fight event contains several fights. Events often have both tournament fights and superfights (single fights).

Overview
Kunlun Fight events are separated into several different formats.

Current:
"Kunlun Fight" highest level events, broadcast on television and iPPV.
"Kunlun Combat Professional League" 2nd tier events. Teams from 16 Chinese cities fight in a league format, broadcast on television and streamed online.
"City Hero" 3rd tier events with a mix of professional and amateur fights, streamed online and occasionally broadcast on local television.

Former:
"Kunlun Fight MMA" mixed martial arts events, broadcast on iPPV and television.
"Road to Kunlun" 2nd tier events, broadcast on iPPV and occasionally local television.
"University Brawn" events for students, streamed online

Kunlun Fight Events

Kunlun Combat Professional League events

Kunlun Fight City Hero events

Road to Kunlun events

See also 
2014 in Kunlun Fight
2015 in Kunlun Fight
2016 in Kunlun Fight
2017 in Kunlun Fight
2018 in Kunlun Fight
2019 in Kunlun Fight
2020 in Kunlun Fight

References

External links
Kunlun Fight events on Sherdog
Kunlun Fight events on Tapology
Kunlun Fight Official Website

Kunlun Fight
Kunlun Fight events
Kickboxing events
Kickboxing in China
Kunlun Fight